Robert Boyd Russell (October 31, 1888 – September 25, 1964) was a labour organizer and politician in Manitoba, Canada. R.B. Russell, as he was known, was a prominent figure in the Winnipeg General Strike of 1919 and was later the leader of Winnipeg's One Big Union.

Born in Scotland, Russell was raised in Glasgow and came to Canada in 1911.  He moved to Winnipeg, and worked as a machinist in the Canadian Pacific Railway's Weston Shops.  He was a member of the Machinists Union Local Lodge 122 in Winnipeg. He also became a prominent member of the Socialist Party of Canada, which at the time represented the left-wing of the labour movement in Manitoba.

In 1919, he attended the Western Labour Conference in Calgary, Alberta, and called for the replacement of narrow craft unionism with an industrial union known as the One Big Union.  During the Winnipeg General Strike, he became a prominent figure in the Strike Committee which managed most city affairs.

After the strike was suppressed, Russell and other strike leaders were arrested on charges of seditious conspiracy.  He was the first of the strikers to go to trial, and was sentenced to a two-year term at Stony Mountain Federal Penitentiary.  Many observers at the time, and many since, have regarded the charges against the strike leaders as unjust and politically motivated.

The strike and the resulting arrests created a temporary climate of labour unity in the city.  The SPC had previously opposed "popular front" campaigns with centrist labour parties, and Russell himself had argued in 1918 that it was pointless to elect labour representatives to capitalist legislatures.  Nevertheless, the SPC agreed to participate in a "united labour" slate for the 1920 provincial election.  Russell, still serving a prison sentence, ran as an SPC candidate in the constituency of Winnipeg, which elected ten members by a single transferable ballot.  He came very close to being elected, finishing ninth on the first count and missing the tenth seat by only sixty-two votes on the final tally.  Russell's fellow prisoner George Armstrong was elected for the SPC, and so became the only member of the party ever to serve in the Manitoba legislature.

Russell also ran for the Socialist Party of Canada in the 1921 federal election, contesting the single-member riding of Winnipeg North.  He finished a close second, losing to Liberal Edward James McMurray by 715 votes.

Russell returned to labour activism following his release from prison in 1922.  He was selected as the leader of the Winnipeg's One Big Union, and held this position into the 1950s.

He campaigned again for the Manitoba legislature in the 1927 provincial election in the constituency of Assinboia, just west of Winnipeg.  As the SPC had folded in 1925, Russell contested this election with support from Manitoba's Independent Labour Party.  He again lost by a narrow margin, falling sixty votes behind Conservative candidate Joseph Cotter.

In Winnipeg, a high school named R.B. Russell Vocational High School was named in his honour.

References

External links
R.B. Russell

1888 births
1964 deaths
Socialist Party of Canada candidates in Manitoba provincial elections
British emigrants to Canada
Politicians from Glasgow
One Big Union (Canada) members
Trade unionists from Manitoba

People of the Winnipeg general strike